Cat on a Hot Tin Roof is a 1958 American drama film directed by Richard Brooks, who co-wrote the screenplay with James Poe, based on the 1955 Pulitzer Prize-winning play of the same name by Tennessee Williams. The film stars Elizabeth Taylor, Paul Newman, Burl Ives, Jack Carson, and Judith Anderson.

Well-received by both critics and audiences, Cat on a Hot Tin Roof was MGM's most successful release of 1958, and became the third highest-grossing film of that year.

Plot

Late one night, a drunken Brick Pollitt is out trying to recapture his glory days of high school sports by leaping hurdles on a track field, dreaming about his moments as a youthful athlete. Unexpectedly, he falls and breaks his ankle, leaving him dependent on a crutch. Brick, along with his wife, Maggie "the Cat", are seen the next day visiting his family's estate in eastern Mississippi, there to celebrate Big Daddy's 65th birthday.

Depressed, Brick has spent the last few years drinking, while resisting the affections of his wife, who taunts him about the inheritance of Big Daddy's wealth. This has resulted in an obviously tempestuous marriage—there are speculations as to why Maggie does not yet have a child while Brick's brother Gooper and his wife Mae have five children.

Big Daddy and Big Mama arrive home from the hospital via their private airplane and are greeted by Gooper and his wife—and all their children—along with Maggie. Annoyed by the rehearsed welcoming display his grandchildren put on for him, Big Daddy ignores them in favor of driving home with Maggie. The news is that Big Daddy is not dying from cancer. However, the doctor later meets privately with first Gooper and then Brick where he divulges that it is a deception. Big Daddy has inoperable cancer and will likely be dead within a year, and the truth is being kept from him. Brick later reveals the truth about Big Daddy's health to Maggie and she is heartbroken. Maggie wants Brick to take an interest in his father—for both selfish and unselfish reasons, but Brick stubbornly refuses.

As the party winds down for the night, Big Daddy meets with Brick in his room and reveals that he is fed up with his alcoholic son's behavior, demanding to know why he is so stubborn. At one point, Maggie joins them and reveals what happened a few years ago on the night Brick's best friend and football teammate Skipper died by suicide. Maggie was jealous of Skipper because he had more of Brick's time, and says that Skip was lost without Brick at his side. She decided to ruin their relationship "by any means necessary", intending to seduce Skipper and use this information to make her husband question Skipper's loyalty. However, Maggie ran away without completing the plan. Brick had blamed Maggie for Skipper's death, but actually blames himself for not helping Skipper when he repeatedly phoned Brick in a hysterical state.

After an argument, Brick lets it slip that Big Daddy will die from cancer and that this birthday will be his last. Shaken, Big Daddy retreats to the basement. Meanwhile, Gooper, who is a lawyer, and his wife argue with Big Mama about the family's cotton business and Big Daddy's will. Brick descends into the basement, a labyrinth of antiques and family possessions hidden away. He and Big Daddy confront each other before a large cut-out of Brick in his glory days as an athlete, and ultimately reach a reconciliation of sorts.

The rest of the family begins to crumble under pressure, with Big Mama stepping up as a strong figure. Maggie says that she would like to give Big Daddy her birthday present: the announcement of her pregnancy. After the jealous Mae calls Maggie a liar, Big Daddy and Brick defend her, even though Brick knows the statement is untrue and Big Daddy thinks the statement may be untrue. In their room, Maggie and Brick reconcile, and the two kiss, with the implication that they will possibly make Maggie's "lie" become "truth".

Cast

 Elizabeth Taylor as Margaret "Maggie the Cat" Pollitt
 Paul Newman as "Brick" Pollitt
 Burl Ives as Harvey "Big Daddy" Pollitt
 Jack Carson as Cooper "Gooper" Pollitt
 Judith Anderson as Ida "Big Mama" Pollitt
 Madeleine Sherwood as Mae Flynn "Sister Woman" Pollitt
 Larry Gates as Dr. Baugh
 Vaughn Taylor as Deacon Davis

Production notes
The original stage production of Cat on a Hot Tin Roof opened on Broadway on March 24, 1955, with Ives and Sherwood in the roles they subsequently played in the film. Ben Gazzara played Brick in the stage production and rejected the film role. Athlete-turned-actor Floyd Simmons also tested for the role.

Lana Turner and Grace Kelly were both considered for the part of Maggie before the role went to Taylor.

Production began on March 12, 1958, and by March 19, Taylor had contracted a virus which kept her off the shoot. On March 21, she canceled plans to fly with her husband Mike Todd to New York City, where he was to be honored the following day by the New York Friars' Club. The plane crashed, and all passengers, including Todd, were killed. Beset with grief, Taylor remained off the film until April 14, 1958, at which time she returned to the set in a much thinner and weaker condition.

Music and soundtrack
The music score, "Love Theme from Cat on a Hot Tin Roof", was composed by Charles Wolcott in 1958. He was an accomplished music composer, having worked for Paul Whiteman, Benny Goodman, Rudy Vallee and George Burns and Gracie Allen. From 1937 to 1944, he worked at Walt Disney Studios. In 1950, he transferred to Metro-Goldwyn-Mayer (MGM) Studios where he became the general music director and composed the theme for Cat on a Hot Tin Roof. The remaining songs on the soundtrack are composed by a variety of artists such as Andre Previn, Daniel Decatur Emmett and Ludwig van Beethoven.

Song list
 "Lost in a Summer Night" by André Previn and Milton Raskin
 "Nice Layout" by André Previn
 "Love Theme from Cat on a Hot Tin Roof" by Charles Wolcott
 "Dixie" by Daniel Decatur Emmett, played by the children on various instruments
 "Skina Marinka", adapted by Marguerite Lamkin, sung by the children
 "I'll Be a Sunbeam" by E.O. Excell, sung by the children
 "Boom, Boom Ain't It Great to Be Crazy", adapted by Marguerite Lamkin, sung by the children
 "Kermit Returns" by André Previn
 "Fourth Movement, Symphony No. 5 in C minor, Op. 67" by Ludwig van Beethoven, played on a radio
 "For He's a Jolly Good Fellow", traditional, sung by the family
 "Some Folks" by Stephen Foster, played on a phonograph
 "Soothe My Lonely Heart" by Jeff Alexander

Reception

Tennessee Williams was reportedly unhappy with the screenplay, which removed almost all of the homosexual themes and revised the third act section to include a lengthy scene of reconciliation between Brick and Big Daddy. Paul Newman, the film's star, had also stated his disappointment with the adaptation. The Hays Code limited Brick's portrayal of sexual desire from Skipper, and diminished the original play's critique of homophobia and sexism. Williams so disliked the toned-down film adaptation of his play that he told people waiting in line to see the film, "This movie will set the industry back 50 years. Go home!"

Despite this, the film was highly acclaimed by critics. Bosley Crowther of The New York Times wrote that although "Mr. Williams' original stage play has been altered considerably, especially in offering explanation of why the son is as he is", he still found the film "a ferocious and fascinating show", and deemed Newman's performance "an ingratiating picture of a tortured and tested young man" and Taylor "terrific." Variety called the picture "a powerful, well-seasoned film produced within the bounds of good, if 'adults only,' taste ... Newman again proves to be one of the finest actors in films, playing cynical underacting against highly developed action." Harrison's Reports declared it "an intense adult drama, superbly acted by a formidable cast." Richard L. Coe of The Washington Post wrote, "Cat on a Hot Tin Roof has been transposed to the screen with almost astonishing skill ... Paul Newman does his finest work in the rich role of Brick, catching that remarkable fact of film acting—the illusion of the first time. It's a superlative performance and he's bound to be nominated for an Oscar." Philip K. Scheuer of the Los Angeles Times declared, "It was a powerful stage drama and it is a powerful screen drama, and Brooks has exacted—and extracted—stunningly real and varied performances from his players ... You may not like it but you won't forget it readily."

Not all reviews were as positive. John McCarten of The New Yorker wrote of the characters that "although it is interesting for a while to listen to them letting off emotional steam, their caterwauling (boosted Lord knows how many decibels by stereophonic sound) eventually becomes severely monotonous." McCarten also lamented that the filmmakers were "unable to indicate more than fleetingly the real problem of the hero—homosexuality, which is, of course, a taboo subject in American movies." The Monthly Film Bulletin shared that regret, writing, "Censorship difficulties admittedly make it impossible to show homosexuality as the root of Brick's problem, but Brooks does not appear to have the skill to make convincing the motives he has substituted. Most of Williams' exhilarating dialogue has been left out or emasculated, and the screenplay fails to harmonise the revised characterisation of Brick with the author's original conception."

Awards and nominations
The film received six Academy Award nominations. However the film did not win any awards. Best Picture went to Gigi (another Metro-Goldwyn-Mayer production). The same night, Burl Ives won Best Supporting Actor for The Big Country.

Box office
The film was successful with audiences and was number one at the US box office for five consecutive weeks throughout September 1958, grossing $1.6 million in 24 key cities in its first month before being knocked off the top spot by Damn Yankees. It returned to the top spot for the next four weeks and was also the number-one film for the month of October.

According to MGM records, the film earned rentals for the studio of $7,660,000 in the United States and Canada and $3,625,000 elsewhere, resulting in a profit of $2,428,000.

See also
 List of American films of 1958
 Cat on a Hot Tin Roof (1984 film)

References

Bibliography

External links

 
 
 
 
 
 

1958 films
1958 drama films
1950s American films
1950s English-language films
American drama films
American films based on plays
Articles containing video clips
Films about alcoholism
Films about cancer
Films about dysfunctional families
Films about father–son relationships
Films about grieving
Films about marriage
Films based on works by Tennessee Williams
Films directed by Richard Brooks
Films set in Mississippi
Films with screenplays by James Poe
Metro-Goldwyn-Mayer films
Southern Gothic films